Thylamys is a genus of opossums in the family Didelphidae. The premaxillae are rounded rather than pointed. The females lack a pouch. The females' nipples are arranged in two symmetrical rows on the abdomen. All species but T. macrurus store fat in their tails., although this is not necessarily true for all species in the genus. Fossils belonging to the genus date back to the Miocene, with the oldest specimens being found in the Cerro Azul Formation of Argentina and the Honda Group of Colombia. Genetic studies indicate that the genus may have originated around 14 million years ago.

Taxonomy 
Cladogram of living Thylamys species.

Other species of Thylamys.
 †T. colombianus 
 T. fenestrae   
 †T. minutus 
 †T. pinei 
 †T. zettii

References 

Opossums
Marsupial genera
Neogene animals of South America
Quaternary animals of South America
Lujanian
Ensenadan
Uquian
Chapadmalalan
Montehermosan
Huayquerian
Chasicoan
Mayoan
Laventan
Colloncuran
Taxa described in 1843
Taxa named by John Edward Gray
Taxonomy articles created by Polbot